Pierre Mauget (born April 6, 1984, in Nantes) is a French professional footballer, who currently plays in the Championnat de France amateur for USSA Vertou.

Career
He played one game for Angers SCO in the 2004–2005 season in the Ligue 2.

Notess

1984 births
Living people
French footballers
Ligue 2 players
Angers SCO players
Angoulême Charente FC players
Association football defenders
FC Nantes players
USJA Carquefou players
USSA Vertou players